The 1st Division was a division of the Spanish Republican Army in the Spanish Civil War.

This unit was deployed in a relatively inactive section of the front located in the mountainous area north of Madrid.

History 
The First Division was established on 31 December 1936 with the militia forces that had been operating in the Somosierra sector and which had been led by Lt. Colonel Enrique Jurado Barrio. The headquarters of the division was in Loyozuela.

This unit was garrisoned at the secondary sector of El Escorial and did not take part in any important military operation. The commander who replaced Enrique Jurado, Lt. Colonel Fernando Cueto Herrero, was discovered when he was trying to join the enemy forces and was summarily dismissed and shot for treason on 18 September 1937. Except for a few sporadic skirmishes the unit rarely saw combat action and was mainly engaged in fortification work. The First Division was disbanded at the end of the war in late March 1939.

Order of battle

Leaders 
Commanders
 Lt. Colonel Enrique Jurado Barrio;
 Lt. Colonel Fernando Cueto Herrero;
 Infantry Commander Ernesto Güemes Ramos;
 Militia Major Dionisio Hortelano Hortelano;
 Militia Major Raimundo Calvo Moreno;
 Militia Major Juan Sáez de Diego;

Commissars
 Alberto Barragán López, member of the Spanish Socialist Workers' Party (PSOE);
 Victorio Casado Fernández, member of the (PSOE);

Chief of Staff
 Carabineros Commander Rafael Quintana Vilches;

See also 
 Mixed Brigades

References

Bibliography

External links 
 SBHAC - El Ejército Popular
 Organización militar republicana - 1936 - La Guerra Civil 

Military units and formations established in 1936
Military units and formations disestablished in 1939
Divisions of Spain
Military units and formations of the Spanish Civil War
Military history of Spain
Armed Forces of the Second Spanish Republic
1936 establishments in Spain
1939 establishments in Spain